The following lists events that happened during  1957 in New Zealand.

Population
 Estimated population as of 31 December: 2,262,800
 Increase since 31 December 1956: 53,600 (2.43%)
 Males per 100 females: 101.1

Incumbents

Regal and viceregal
Head of State – Elizabeth II
Governor-General – Lieutenant-General The Lord Norrie GCMG GCVO CB DSO MC followed by The Viscount Cobham GCMG TD.

Government
The 31st New Zealand Parliament continued. In power was the National government under Sidney Holland and later Keith Holyoake. The general election saw the Labour Party win by a narrow two-seat margin.

Speaker of the House – Mathew Oram
Prime Minister – Sidney Holland then Keith Holyoake then Walter Nash
Deputy Prime Minister – Keith Holyoake then Jack Marshall then Jerry Skinner
Minister of Finance – Jack Watts then Arnold Nordmeyer
Minister of Foreign Affairs – Tom Macdonald then Walter Nash
Chief Justice — Sir Harold Barrowclough

Parliamentary opposition 
 Leader of the Opposition –   Walter Nash (Labour) until 12 December, then Keith Holyoake (National).

Main centre leaders
Mayor of Auckland – Thomas Ashby, then Keith Buttle
Mayor of Hamilton – Roderick Braithwaite
Mayor of Wellington – Frank Kitts
Mayor of Christchurch – Robert M. Macfarlane
Mayor of Dunedin – Leonard Morton Wright

Events 

 20 January: Scott Base, New Zealand's main presence in Antarctica, is established by Sir Edmund Hillary.
 24 May: the last Empire Day is commemorated.
 September: Former Member of Parliament and New Zealand ambassador to the United States Leslie Munro is appointed President of the United Nations General Assembly for its twelfth session, lasting until September 1958

Arts and literature

See 1957 in art, 1957 in literature

Music

See: 1957 in music

Radio

See: Public broadcasting in New Zealand

Film

See: :Category:1957 film awards, 1957 in film, List of New Zealand feature films, Cinema of New Zealand, :Category:1957 films

Sport

Athletics
Edwin Rye wins his second national title in the men's marathon, clocking 2:44:56 in Napier.

Chess
 The 64th National Chess Championship was held in Wellington. The title was shared by A. Feneridis of Wellington and J.R. Phillips of Auckland.

Horse racing

Harness racing
 New Zealand Trotting Cup – Lookaway
 Auckland Trotting Cup – Highland Air

Lawn bowls
The national outdoor lawn bowls championships are held in Auckland.
 Men's singles champion – James Pirret (Tuakau Bowling Club)
 Men's pair champions – H. Franks, L. Franks (skip) (Balmoral Bowling Club)
 Men's fours champions – F.M. Murray, W.W. Wearne, A.N. Callaghan, Ron Buchan (skip) (Tui Park Bowling Club)

Rugby union
 The All Blacks played two Test matches against Australia, retaining the Bledisloe Cup:
 25 May, Sydney Cricket Ground: New Zealand 25 – 11 Australia
 1 June, Exhibition Ground, Brisbane: New Zealand 22 – 9 Australia

Soccer
 The national men's team was host to two visiting club sides:
 22 June, Wellington: NZ 1 – 1 Eastern Athletic
 24 June, Auckland: NZ 2 – 1	Eastern Athletic
 27 June, Auckland: NZ 1 – 7 FK Austria
 3 August, Wellington: NZ 1 – 7 FK Austria
 The Chatham Cup is won by Seatoun who beat Technical Old Boys 3–1 in the final.
 Provincial league champions:
	Auckland:	Eastern Suburbs AFC
	Bay of Plenty:	Rangers
	Buller:	Millerton Thistle
	Canterbury:	Western
	Hawke's Bay:	Hastings Wanderers
	Manawatu:	Ohakea
	Marlborough:	Blenheim Rangers
	Nelson:	Athletic
	Northland:	Otangarei United
	Otago:	King Edward Technical College OB
	Poverty Bay:	Eastern Union
	South Canterbury:	Northern Hearts
	Southland:	Hotspurs
	Taranaki:	City
	Waikato:	Huntly Thistle
	Wairarapa:	Masterton Athletic
	Wanganui:	New Settlers
	Wellington:	Seatoun AFC

Births
 3 January – Dave Dobbyn, singer, songwriter
 28 February – Ian Smith, cricketer
 2 March – Stu Gillespie, cricketer
 19 April – Wayne Smith, rugby player and coach
 30 April – Tony Rogers, middle-distance runner
 30 May – Allison Roe, athlete
 20 June – Chester Borrows, politician (died 2023)
 24 June – Elizabeth Fuller, children's book illustrator
 26 June – Michael Laws, broadcaster, writer and politician
 27 July – Barbara Moore, long-distance runner
 28 July – David Shearer, humanitarian worker and politician, was Leader of the Opposition (2011–2013)
 11 August – Ruth Dyson, politician
 31 August (in Kenya) – Luke Hurley, singer/songwriter
 20 September – Michael Hurst, actor
 10 October – Rod Donald, environmentalist and politician, co-leader of the Green Party of Aotearoa New Zealand (1995–2005) (died 2005)
 29 November – Glenys Quick, long-distance runner
 13 December – Buck Shelford, rugby player
 Richard Adams, violinist.
 George Bertrand, who became Georgina Beyer, transgender politician.
 Howard Broad, Commissioner of Police

Deaths
 2 January: William Aitchison, politician.
 19 January: Thomas Brash, dairy industry leader and Presbyterian Church moderator.
 21 January: Maurice Brownlie, rugby union player.
 18 February: Walter James Bolton, last person executed in New Zealand.
 2 April:  Catherine Stewart, politician.
 3 May: Daisy Osborn, artist.
 17 September: Anton Bernhardt Julius Lemmer, music school director and conductor.
 26 September: Thomas Ashby, serving mayor of Auckland.

See also
List of years in New Zealand
Timeline of New Zealand history
History of New Zealand
Military history of New Zealand
Timeline of the New Zealand environment
Timeline of New Zealand's links with Antarctica

For world events and topics in 1957 not specifically related to New Zealand see: 1957

References

External links

 
Years of the 20th century in New Zealand